Walter Hunter Thorburn (7 October 1884 — 27 March 1957) was a Scottish first-class cricketer.

The son of M. G. Thorburn, he was born in October 1884 at Innerleithen, Peebleshire. He was educated in England at Marlborough College. In September 1903, he joined the Lanarkshire Imperial Yeomanry as a second lieutenant. A club cricketer for Peebleshire, he made his debut in first-class cricket for Scotland against Ireland at Perth in 1909. He played first-class cricket for Scotland until 1912, making a further three appearances against Ireland and one against the touring Indians. He scored 183 runs in his five matches, at an average of 30.50 and a highest score of 90 not out. Thorburn served with the Lanarkshire Imperial Yeomanry in the First World War, holding the rank of captain in July 1916, the month in which he was made a temporary major. Outside of cricket, Thorburn was in business as a woollen manufacturer and mill owner; he was a senior director of Messrs Walter Thorburn & Bros. Ltd. He died at Peebles in March 1957.

References

External links
 

1884 births
1957 deaths
People from the Scottish Borders
People educated at Marlborough College
Imperial Yeomanry officers
Scottish cricketers
British Army personnel of World War I
Scottish businesspeople